Luís Eduardo Pissarra (born 5 October 1975) is a Portuguese former rugby union footballer of Argentine descent. He played as a scrum-half for AEIS Agronomia, with whom he won the National Championship in 2006-07.

Pissarra had 73 games for the Portugal national team, from 1996 to 2007. He was the vice-captain of the Portugal squad at the 2007 Rugby World Cup, where he played in all four games. He left the National Team after the 8-23 loss to Romania, at 1 December 2007, aged 32, in a match where he was the captain. He never scored during his international career.

He was currently one of the assistant coaches of the national team.

References

External links

1975 births
Living people
Portuguese rugby union players
Rugby union scrum-halves
Rugby union players from Lisbon
Portugal international rugby union players